Marc Pyree (born 2 June 1960 in Grand-Bourg, Guadeloupe) is a French karateka, who was part of the French kumite team that won gold at the 1994 World Karate Championships and at the 1980, 1981 and 1993 European Karate Championships.

References

External links
 

1960 births
Living people
French male karateka
French people of Guadeloupean descent
Guadeloupean male karateka
World Games medalists in karate
World Games silver medalists
World Games bronze medalists
Competitors at the 1981 World Games
Competitors at the 1989 World Games
20th-century French people
21st-century French people